Mahant Darshan Das Mahila Mahavidyalaya is a college of Babasaheb Bhimrao Ambedkar Bihar University.  It was founded in 1946 and accepts only women students.

Founding
The college was established on 15 August 1946 near Chapman Girls' High School.

Founders
Rai Bahadur
Shri Narayan Mahatha
Rai Bahadur
Uma Shanker
Shri Harisadan Bhaduri
Rai Bahadur Veereshwar Chatterjee
Shri Atulanand Sen
Shri Mahesh Singh
Mahant Darshan Das

Present day
The college now has about 5,000 students, offering several diploma courses, specifically in microbiology.

And various graduate and undergraduate courses including BSc. , Bachelor of arts etc

Notable Alumni 

Nutan Thakur- Lucknow based political and social activist

External links

Colleges affiliated to Babasaheb Bhimrao Ambedkar Bihar University
Women's universities and colleges in Bihar
Universities and colleges in Muzaffarpur
Educational institutions established in 1946
1946 establishments in India